The Birmingham Canal Navigations Society is a waterway society, a registered charity no. 1091760 (since 1968) and a limited company no. 4306537 (since 2002), operating on the Birmingham Canal Navigations, and based IN Oldbury, West Midlands, England.

See also
List of waterway societies in the United Kingdom
List of navigation authorities in the United Kingdom

External links
BBC Birmingham: BCNS Chairman Phil Clayton writes about the 100 mile long network of Birmingham and Black Country waterways
Birmingham Mail, 6 July 2008, article: Birmingham Canal Navigations Society celebrates 40th anniversary
Inland Waterways Association: Historic Campaigns on the BCN
GEOGRAPH image 352517, Horseley Fields Canal Junction Signpoast, erecetd by BCNS
BBC NEWS, 28 April 2008, Live ammunition found by volunteers cleaning up a Black Country Canal
 BCN Society

Waterways organisations in England
Charities based in the West Midlands (county)
Clubs and societies in the West Midlands (county)